Kicker Vencill is an American swimmer, who won a lawsuit against a dietary supplement company for having contaminated multivitamins which caused him to be suspended from swimming for two years from 2003, even though they were prescribed to him by his doctor. The court awarded him over US$500,000.

He started swimming aged four in Richmond, Kentucky.  He went on to swim for Model Laboratory School in high school and Western Kentucky in college. He represented America at the 2001 World University Games.

References

American male swimmers
Living people
Year of birth missing (living people)